The Western Maori by-election 1945 was a by-election held in the  electorate during the 28th New Zealand Parliament, on 10 February 1945.

Background
The by-election was caused by the death of incumbent MP Toko Ratana on 30 October 1944. He had been the MP since 1935.

The by-election was won by his younger brother Matiu Ratana who also succeeded him as head of the Ratana Church. They were sons of the church founder T W Ratana. Ratana had an electoral alliance with Labour.

The challenger Pei te Hurinui Jones was supported by National and Kingitanga, the Maori King Movement.

Kaponga Erueti who had initially announced his intention to contest the election as an Independent Labour candidate later decided to withdraw from the contest, his withdrawal came late enough that his name still appeared on the ballot paper.

The other six challengers all lost their deposits, although one motorist complainant was aggrieved that all the candidates got a petrol allocation of 250 gallons when the usual personal allocation was ten or fifteen gallons!

Results
The following table gives the election results (the results included some "servicemens votes" 
 from overseas):

References

Western Maori 1945
1945 elections in New Zealand
Western
February 1945 events in New Zealand